Gayatri Chakravorty Spivak  (born 24 February 1942) is an Indian scholar, literary theorist, and feminist critic. She is a University Professor at Columbia University and a founding member of the establishment's Institute for Comparative Literature and Society.

Considered one of the most influential postcolonial intellectuals, Spivak is best known for her essay "Can the Subaltern Speak?" and her translation of and introduction to Jacques Derrida's De la grammatologie. She has also translated many works of Mahasweta Devi into English, with separate critical notes on Devi's life and writing style, notably Imaginary Maps and Breast Stories.

Spivak was awarded the 2012 Kyoto Prize in Arts and Philosophy for being "a critical theorist and educator speaking for the humanities against intellectual colonialism in relation to the globalized world." In 2013, she received the Padma Bhushan, the third highest civilian award given by the Republic of India.

Although associated with postcolonialism, Spivak confirmed her separation from the discipline in her book A Critique of Postcolonial Reason (1999), a position she maintains in a 2021 essay titled "How the Heritage of Postcolonial Studies Thinks Colonialism Today",  published by Janus Unbound: Journal of Critical Studies.

Life

Early life 
Spivak was born Gayatri Chakravorty in Calcutta, India, to Pares Chandra and Sivani Chakravorty. After completing her secondary education at St. John's Diocesan Girls' Higher Secondary School, Spivak attended Presidency College, Kolkata under the University of Calcutta, from which she graduated in 1959.

Spivak has been married twice—first to Talbot Spivak, from 1964 to 1977, and then to Basudev Chatterji. She has no children.

1960s and 1970s 
In 1959, upon graduation, she secured employment as an English tutor for forty hours a week. Her MA thesis was on the representation of innocence in Wordsworth with M.H. Abrams. In 1961, Spivak joined the graduate program in English at Cornell University in the United States, traveling on money borrowed on a so-called "life mortgage". In 1962, unable to secure financial aid from the department of English, she transferred to a new program called Comparative Literature, although she had insufficient preparation in French and German. Her dissertation was under the guidance of the program's first director, Paul de Man, titled Myself Must I Remake: The Life and Poetry of W.B. Yeats. In 1963–1964, she attended Girton College, Cambridge, as a research student under the supervision of Professor T.R. Henn, writing on the representation of the stages of development of the lyric subject in the poetry of Yeats. She presented a course in the summer of 1963 on "Yeats and the Theme of Death" at the Yeats Summer School in Sligo, Ireland. (She returned there in 1987 to present Yeats' position within post-coloniality.)

In the Fall of 1965, Spivak became an assistant professor in the English department of the University of Iowa. She received tenure in 1970. She did not publish her doctoral dissertation, but decided to write a critical book on Yeats that would be accessible to her undergraduate students without compromising her intellectual positions. The result was her first book, written for young adults, Myself I Must Remake: The Life and Poetry of W.B. Yeats.

In 1967, on her regular attempts at self-improvement, Spivak purchased a book, by an author unknown to her, entitled De la grammatologie. She decided to translate the book by an unknown author, and wrote a long translator's preface. This publication was immediately a success, and the Translator's Preface began to be used around the world as an introduction to the philosophy of deconstruction launched by the author, Jacques Derrida, whom Spivak met in 1971.

In 1974, at the University of Iowa, Spivak founded the MFA in Translation in the department of Comparative Literature. The following year, she became the Director of the Program in Comparative Literature and was promoted to a full professorship. In 1978, she was National Humanities Professor at the University of Chicago. She received many subsequent residential visiting professorships and fellowships. In 1978, she joined the University of Texas at Austin as professor of English and Comparative Literature.

1980s to present 
In 1982, she was appointed as the Longstreet Professor in English and Comparative Literature at Emory University. In 1986, at the University of Pittsburgh, she became the first Mellon Professor of English. Here, she established the Cultural Studies program. From 1991, she was a member of faculty at Columbia University as Avalon Foundation Professor in the Humanities, where, in 2007, she was made University Professor in the Humanities.

Since 1986, Spivak has been engaged in teaching and training adults and children among the landless illiterates on the border of West Bengal and Bihar/Jharkhand. This sustained attempt to access the epistemologies damaged by the millennial oppression of the caste system has allowed her to understand the situation of globality as well as the limits of high theory more clearly. In 1997, her friend Lore Metzger, a survivor of the Third Reich, left her $10,000 in her will, to help with the work of rural education. With this, Spivak established the Pares Chandra and Sivani Chakravorty Memorial Foundation for Rural Education; to which she contributed the majority of her Kyoto Prize.

Work

Spivak rose to prominence with her translation of Derrida's De la grammatologie, which included a translator's introduction that has been described as "setting a new standard for self-reflexivity in prefaces". After this, as a member of the "Subaltern Studies Collective", she carried out a series of historical studies and literary critiques of imperialism and international feminism. She has often referred to herself as a "practical Marxist-feminist-deconstructionist". Her predominant ethico-political concern has been for the space occupied by the subaltern, especially subaltern women, both in discursive practices and in institutions of Western cultures. Edward Said wrote of Spivak's work, "She pioneered the study in literary theory of non-Western women and produced one of the earliest and most coherent accounts of that role available to us."

"Can the Subaltern Speak?" 
Her essay, "Can the Subaltern Speak?" (1988), established Spivak among the ranks of feminists who consider history, geography, and class when thinking about women. In "Can the Subaltern Speak?", Spivak discusses the lack of an account of the Sati practice, leading her to reflect on whether the subaltern can even speak.  Spivak writes about the process, the focus on the Eurocentric Subject as they disavow the problem of representation; and by invoking the Subject of Europe, these intellectuals constitute the subaltern 'Other of Europe' as anonymous and mute. In all her work, Spivak's main effort has been to try to find ways of accessing the subjectivity of those who are being investigated. She is hailed as a critic who has feminized and globalized the philosophy of deconstruction, considering the position of the subaltern (a word used by Antonio Gramsci as describing ungeneralizable fringe groups of society who lack access to citizenship).

In the early 1980s, she was also hailed as a co-founder of postcolonial theory, which she refused to accept fully. Her A Critique of Postcolonial Reason, published in 1999, explores how major works of European metaphysics (e.g., Kant, Hegel) not only tend to exclude the subaltern from their discussions, but actively prevent non-Europeans from occupying positions as fully human subjects. In this work, Spivak launched the concept of "sanctioned ignorance" for the "reproducing and foreclosing of colonialist structures". This concept denotes a purposeful silencing through the "dismissing of a particular context as being irrelevant"; an institutionalized and ideological way of presenting the world.

Spivak coined the term "strategic essentialism", which refers to a sort of temporary solidarity for the purpose of social action. For example, women's groups have many different agendas that potentially make it difficult for feminists to work together for common causes. "Strategic essentialism" allows for disparate groups to accept temporarily an "essentialist" position that enables them able to act cohesively and "can be powerfully displacing and disruptive."

However, while others have built upon the idea of "strategic essentialism", Spivak has been unhappy with the ways the concept has been taken up and used. In interviews, she has disavowed the term, although she has not completely deserted the concept itself.

In speeches given and published since 2002, Spivak has addressed the issue of terrorism and suicide bombings. With the aim of bringing an end to suicide bombings, she has explored and "tried to imagine what message [such acts] might contain", ruminating that "suicidal resistance is a message inscribed in the body when no other means will get through". One critic has suggested that this sort of stylised language may serve to blur important moral issues relating to terrorism. However, Spivak stated in the same speech that "single coerced yet willed suicidal 'terror' is in excess of the destruction of dynastic temples and the violation of women, tenacious and powerfully residual. It has not the banality of evil. It is informed by the stupidity of belief taken to extreme."

Apart from Derrida, Spivak has also translated the fiction of the Bengali author, Mahasweta Devi, the poetry of the 18-century Bengali poet Ramprasad Sen, and A Season in the Congo by Aimé Césaire, a poet, essayist, and statesman from Martinique. In 1997, she received a prize for translation into English from the Sahitya Akadami from the National Academy of Literature in India.

Academic roles and honors 
She has been a Guggenheim fellow, has received numerous academic honours including an honorary doctorate from Oberlin College, and has been on the editorial board of academic journals such as Boundary 2. She was elected to the American Philosophical Society in 2007. In March of that same year, Columbia University President Lee Bollinger appointed Spivak University Professor, the institution's highest faculty rank. In a letter to the faculty, he wrote:

Spivak has served on the advisory board of numerous academic journals, including Janus Unbound: Journal of Critical Studies published by Memorial University of Newfoundland, differences, Signs: Journal of Women in Culture and Society, Interventions: International Journal of Postcolonial Studies published by Routledge, and Diaspora: A Journal of Transnational Studies. Spivak has received 11 honorary doctorates from the University of Toronto, University of London, Oberlin College, Universitat Rovira Virgili, Rabindra Bharati University, Universidad Nacional de San Martín, University of St Andrews, Université de Vincennes à Saint-Denis, Presidency University, Yale University, and University of Ghana-Legon. In 2012, she became the only Indian recipient of the Kyoto Prize in Arts and Philosophy in the category of Arts and Philosophy, while in 2021 she was elected a corresponding fellow of the British Academy.

Spivak has advised many significant post-colonial scholars. Professors Jenny Sharpe and Mark Sanders are among her former students.

Criticism

Spivak has often been criticized for her cryptic prose. Terry Eagleton laments that

Writing for the New Statesman, Stephen Howe complained that "Spivak is so bewilderingly eclectic, so prone to juxtapose diverse notions without synthesis, that ascribing a coherent position to her on any question is extremely difficult."

Judith Butler, in a response critical of Eagleton's position, cited Adorno's comment on the lesser value of the work of theorists who "recirculate received opinion", and opined that Spivak "gives us the political landscape of culture in its obscurity and proximity", and that Spivak's supposedly "complex" language has resonated with and profoundly changed the thinking of "tens of thousands of activists and scholars", and continues to do so.

Avital Ronell controversy 
In May 2018, Spivak signed a collective letter to New York University to defend Avital Ronell, a colleague of Spivak, against the charge of sexual abuse from NYU graduate student Nimrod Reitman. Spivak and the other signatories called the case a "legal nightmare" for Ronell and charged Reitman with conducting a "malicious campaign" against her. More specifically, the letter suggested that Ronell should be excused on the basis of the significance of her academic contributions. Many signatories were also concerned of the utilisation of feminist tools, like Title IX, to take down feminists. Judith Butler, the chief signatory, subsequently apologized for certain aspects of the letter. NYU ultimately found Ronell guilty of sexual harassment and suspended her for a year.

Publications

Academic books
 
 This is a collection of previously published essays.
 This collection was edited by Ranajit Guha and Spivak, and includes an introduction by Spivak.
 This collection of interviews was edited by Sarah Harasym.

 These conversations were conducted with Swapan Chakravorty, Suzana Milevska, and Tani E. Barlow.
 This book was co-authored by Spivak and Judith Butler.

 This book engages with photographs by Alice Attie.

Selected essays
"Translator's Preface" in Of Grammatology, Jacques Derrida, trans. Gayatri Chakravorty Spivak. Baltimore & London: Johns Hopkins University Press. ix-lxxxvii. 1976.

"Speculations on Reading Marx: After Reading Derrida" in Post-Structuralism and the Question of History, eds. Derek Attridge, et al. Cambridge: Cambridge University Press. 30–62. 1987.
"Can the Subaltern Speak?" in Marxism and the Interpretation of Culture, eds. Cary Nelson and Lawrence Grossberg. Basingstoke: Macmillan. 271–313. 1988.
"Woman in Difference: Mahasweta Devi’s ‘Douloti the Bountiful’" in Nationalisms and Sexuality, eds. Andrew Parker et al. New York: Routledge. 96–120. 1992.

Translations
 This translation includes a lengthy critical preface by Spivak.
 This translation includes a critical introduction of the three stories.
 This translation includes a critical introduction of the three stories.
 This translation includes an introduction to the story.
 This translation includes a critical introduction of the two stories.
 This translation includes a critical introduction of the novel.
 This translation includes a critical introduction of the novel.
Red Thread (forthcoming)

In popular culture
Phire Esho, Chaka, a 1961 book of love poems by Binoy Majumdar, was addressed and dedicated to her.

Her name appears in the lyrics of the Le Tigre song "Hot Topic".

See also
List of deconstructionists
Postcolonialism
Postcolonial feminism
Subaltern Studies
Comparative literature

References

Further reading

External links
 
 "Righting Wrongs" (read full article)
 "Spivak's Rani of Sirmur"
 "'Woman' as Theatre" in Radical Philosophy
"In the Gaudy Supermarket" – A critical review of A Critique of Post-Colonial Reason: Toward a History of the Vanishing Present by Terry Eagleton in the London Review of Books, May 1999
"Exacting Solidarities" – Letters responding to Eagleton's review of Spivak by Judith Butler and others
Glossary of Key Terms in the Work of Spivak
 MLA Journals: PMLA, Vol. 123, No. 1, January 2008
 MLA Journals: PMLA, Vol. 125, No. 4, October 2010
 ; Gayatri Spivak describes her 2012 collection from Harvard University Press
  "Creating a Stir Wherever she goes" – The New York Times, February 2002
 Reading Spivak

1942 births
Critical theorists
Indian feminists
Bengali writers
Columbia University faculty
University of Calcutta alumni
Cornell University alumni
Alumni of Girton College, Cambridge
Deconstruction
Indian emigrants to the United States
Indian Marxists
American women writers of Indian descent
American people of Bengali descent
Living people
Marxist feminists
Poststructuralists
University of Iowa alumni
Multicultural feminism
Indian women philosophers
Translators of Jacques Derrida
Kyoto laureates in Arts and Philosophy
Postcolonial theorists
Recipients of the Padma Bhushan in literature & education
20th-century American women
Literary theorists
Postcolonial literature
French women writers
21st-century Indian women writers
21st-century Indian writers
20th-century Indian translators
21st-century Indian translators
20th-century American writers
21st-century American writers
Lady Brabourne College alumni
20th-century Indian women writers
21st-century Indian philosophers
20th-century Indian philosophers
21st-century American women
Writers from Kolkata
21st-century Indian women scientists
21st-century Indian scientists
20th-century Indian women scientists
20th-century Indian scientists
Indian political writers
Indian women political writers
Women writers from West Bengal
Indian women translators
Scholars from Kolkata
20th-century French women
Recipients of the Sahitya Akademi Prize for Translation
American people of Indian descent